Glen Arvon, originally known as Glenarvon, is a historic plantation house and farm located near Bremo Bluff, Fluvanna County, Virginia.  The main house was built in 1836, and is a two-story, five bay, brick dwelling in the Greek Revival style. It measures 50 feet by 40 feet and is topped by a shallow hipped roof with balustrade.  The front facade features a two-story Greek Doric order portico. Also on the property is the contributing two-story, brick servant's house.  The house is a twin of Point of Fork, as they were built by brothers William and James Galt.

It was listed on the National Register of Historic Places in 1976.

References

Plantation houses in Virginia
Houses on the National Register of Historic Places in Virginia
Greek Revival houses in Virginia
Houses completed in 1836
Houses in Fluvanna County, Virginia
National Register of Historic Places in Fluvanna County, Virginia